White Roding Windmill is a Grade II listed preserved tower mill at White Roding, Essex, England.

History
White Roding Windmill was built in 1877, replacing a post mill which had stood on the site since 1609.  The post mill was destroyed on 1 January 1877 when the main post broke in a gale as the miller had too much cloth spread on the Common sails. A new tower mill was built by Whitmore's the Wickham Market, Suffolk millwrights to replace the post mill. The mill worked by wind until 1926, and then by engine until 1931. The lease on the mill expired that year and was not renewed. In 1937, the mill was purchased by the actor Michael Redgrave, passing to a company in Barrow-in-Furness in 1946. During the 1950s, the mill was derelict and threatened with demolition on more than one occasion. In the 1970s, millwrights Philip Barrett-Lennard and Vincent Pargeter built a new cap for the mill.

Description

White Roding windmill is a five-storey brick tower mill which had an ogee cap winded by a six bladed Fantail. It had four Patent sails carried on a cast iron windshaft. The only remaining piece of machinery is the Brake Wheel, which is  diameter with 115 cogs. All other machinery was removed shortly after the Second World War.

The mill drove two pairs of underdrift millstones.

Millers
George Wilson 1830–1839 (post mill)
William Portway 1845–1848
John Dixon 1850
Benjamin Roast 1855–1877
Benjamin Roast 1877–1890 (tower mill)
William and Frank Roast 1890–1917
William Garner and Sons 1917 - 1936

Reference for above:-

References

External links

Windmill World webpage on White Roding Windmill.

Windmills in Essex
History of Essex
Grade II listed buildings in Essex
Tower mills in the United Kingdom
Grinding mills in the United Kingdom
Windmills completed in 1877
Uttlesford
Grade II listed windmills
1877 establishments in England